Charles R. Holland (born January 21, 1946) is a retired United States Air Force General who served as the Commander of United States Special Operations Command (USSOCOM) Headquarters at MacDill Air Force Base, Florida. As Commander, he was responsible for all special operations forces across every branch in the U.S. Armed Forces. Currently, Holland is the first and the only member of the U.S. Air Force to serve as commander of USSOCOM.

Career 
Holland entered the Air Force in 1968 after graduating from the United States Air Force Academy. His early commands over his career included a squadron and two Air Force wings. He flew more than 100 combat missions, including 79 in an AC-130 Gunship in Southeast Asia. He served as Deputy Commanding General of the Joint Special Operations Command, was Commander of the Special Operations Command, Pacific, commanded the Air Force Special Operations Command at Hurlburt Field, Florida, and was the Vice Commander of U.S. Air Forces in Europe at Ramstein Air Base, Germany. His final assignment was commanding USSOCOM at MacDill. He retired November 1, 2003.

Education

Assignments 
August 1968 – August 1969, student, undergraduate pilot training, Reese AFB, Texas
September 1969 – November 1969, student, initial C-130E pilot qualification training, Sewart AFB, Tennessee
November 1969 – September 1972, C-130E pilot, 347th and 772nd tactical airlift squadrons, Dyess AFB, Texas
October 1972 – January 1973, student, AC-130E combat crew training, Hurlburt Field, Florida
January 1973 – January 1974, AC-130E/H aircraft commander, instructor pilot, and standardization and evaluation pilot, 16th Special Operations Squadron, Ubon Royal Thai AFB, Thailand
February 1974 – January 1976, Air Operations Staff Officer, Directorate of Airlift, Headquarters U.S. Air Forces in Europe, Ramstein AB, West Germany
January 1976 – April 1977, Joint Training Exercise Plans Officer, Military Airlift Center Europe, Ramstein AB, West Germany
May 1977 – December 1978, astronautical engineering graduate student, Air Force Institute of Technology, Wright-Patterson AFB, Ohio
January 1979 – May 1983, Chief, Space Shuttle Flight Operations Branch, later, Deputy Director for Policy Planning, later, Executive to the Commander, Space Division, Los Angeles Air Force Station, California
June 1983 – August 1983, student, C-130E requalification course, Little Rock AFB, Arkansas
September 1983 – June 1985, Commander, 21st Tactical Airlift Squadron, Clark AB, Philippines
July 1985 – June 1986, student, Industrial College of the Armed Forces, Fort Lesley J. McNair, Washington, D.C.
June 1986 – June 1987, Deputy Chief, Airlift and Training Division, Directorate of Operational Requirements, Deputy Chief of Staff for Research, Development and Acquisition, Headquarters U.S. Air Force, Washington, D.C.
June 1987 – June 1988, Chief, Airlift and Training Division, Directorate of Strategic, Special Operations Forces and Airlift, Military Deputy for Acquisition, Office of the Assistant Secretary of the Air Force, Washington, D.C.
June 1988 – June 1991, Vice Commander, later, Commander, 1550th Combat Crew Training Wing, Kirtland AFB, New Mexico
June 1991 – June 1993, Commander, 1st Special Operations Wing, Hurlburt Field, Florida
June 1993 – June 1995, Deputy Commanding General, Joint Special Operations Command, Fort Bragg, North Carolina
June 1995 – June 1997, Commander, Special Operations Command, Pacific at Camp H.M. Smith, Hawaii
July 1997 – August 1999, Commander, Air Force Special Operations Command, Hurlburt Field, Florida
August 1999 – October 2000, Vice Commander, U.S. Air Forces in Europe, Ramstein AB, Germany
October 2000 – October 2003, Commander, Headquarters U.S. Special Operations Command, MacDill AFB, Florida

Flight Information

Awards and decorations

Effective dates of promotion

References 

United States Air Force generals
United States Air Force Academy alumni
Recipients of the Air Force Distinguished Service Medal
Recipients of the Legion of Merit
Recipients of the Distinguished Flying Cross (United States)
Harvard Kennedy School alumni
Living people
Recipients of the Air Medal
Recipients of the Order of the Sword (United States)
Recipients of the Defense Superior Service Medal
1946 births
Air Force Institute of Technology alumni
Troy University alumni